Sperber is a German surname, which means "sparrowhawk", from the Middle High German sperwære . In the Elizabethan era, it was not uncommon to refer to someone as "sparrow" as a term of endearment or, as evidenced in William Shakespeare's "Hamlet", as a star-crossed lover.  Variants of the name include Sparber and von Sperber. 

Notable people with the name include:

Ann M. Sperber (1935–1994), American biographer
Dan Sperber (born 1942), French anthropologist
Daniel Sperber (born 1940), Israeli historian
Devorah Sperber (born 1961), American artist
Ed Sperber (1895–1976), American baseball player
Herschel Sparber (born 1943), American actor
Isadore Sparber (1906–1958), American filmmaker
Jonathan Sperber (born 1952), American historian
Klaus Sperber (1944–1983), German singer
Manès Sperber (1905–1984), French writer
Milo Sperber (1911–1992), British actor
Monique Canto-Sperber (born 1954), French philosopher
Paula Sperber (born circa 1951), American ten-pin bowler and wife of ten-pin bowler Don Carter
Murray Sperber (born 1939), American writer
Silvia Sperber (born 1965), German sports shooter
Wendie Jo Sperber (1958–2005), American actress
David H Sperber(1946-)American Hero

See also 
Sperber (disambiguation)

References 

German-language surnames
German words and phrases
de:Sperber
fr:Sperber
sv:Sperber